The Keriya River is a river in the province of Xinjiang in China. The only major settlement along the river is Keriya Town, east of Hotan. The river is an important source of irrigation water and also supplies historically important oases along its course.

Situated in an extremely arid region, the river is heavily dependent on glacier meltwater, which provides about 71% of its flow. Some 20% comes from groundwater seepage, and only 9% comes from direct precipitation. Historical accounts suggest that the river may have reached the Tarim as recently as 200 B.C, when the climate in the area was wetter and much less water was being used by human activities.

See also
Karakash River
Khotan River
List of rivers of China
Yurungkash River

References

External links
 Keriya River marked on OpenStreetMap

Rivers of Xinjiang